Sri Savarindira (10 September 1862 – 17 December 1955), also known as Savang Vadhana , was a consort and half-sister of Chulalongkorn (Rama V), but she was not the Rajini or the highest ranked consort. After her first grandson's accession to power in 1935, she became known as Somdetch Phra Phan Vassa Ayika Chao (สมเด็จพระพันวัสสาอัยยิกาเจ้า; ; "the Queen Grandmother"). All her children died before her, so she lived to see her grandsons Ananda Mahidol and Bhumibol Adulyadej take the throne.

Life

She was the 27th daughter of King Rama IV (King Mongkut or Rama IV) and Princess Consort Piam and thus her husband's half-sister. Her marriage to Chulalongkorn produced the following children:

 Crown Prince Maha Vajirunhis (27 June 1878 – 4 January 1894)
 Prince Isariyalongkorn (4 September 1879 – 25 September 1879)
 Princess Vichitra Chiraprabha (21 April 1881 – 15 August 1881)
 Prince Sommatiwongse Varodaya, the Prince of Sri Dharmaraj (9 June 1882 – 17 June 1899)
 Princess Valaya Alongkorn, the Princess of Phetchaburi (16 April 1884 – 15 February 1938)
 Princess Sirabhorn Sobhon (19 July 1888 – 24 May 1898)
 Prince Mahidol Adulyadej, the Prince of Songkla, (posthumously The Prince Father of Thailand; 1 January 1892 – 24 September 1929), father of Princess Galyani Vadhana, King Rama VIII, and King Rama IX
 Princess (unnamed)

In addition, the queen also adopted several of her husband's children and raised them as her own children:
 Yaovabha Bongsanid (28 August 1884 – 13 June 1934), first child of Chao Chom Manda Mom Rajawongse Nueng Sanidvongs
 Prabha Bannabilaya (13 August 1885 – 8 September 1948), first child of Chao Chom Manda Phrom
 Rangsit Prayurasakdi, the Prince of Chainat (12 November 1885 – 7 March 1951), second child of Chao Chom Manda Mom Rajawongse Nueng Sanidvongs, later served briefly as Regent of Siam for his nephew King Bhumibol Adulyadej
 Vapi Busbakara (25 June 1891 – 15 December 1982), fourth child of Chao Chom Manda Phrom

All of her biological children died before her death, including two of her sons first in line to the throne, Vajirunhis and Mahidol.

When King Prajadhipok (or Rama VII) abdicated in 1935, the son of Queen Savang Vadhana's youngest son, Prince Ananda Mahidol, acceded to the throne as King Ananda Mahidol (Rama VIII). She received the title of Queen Grandmother, having been renamed Sri Savarindira by King Prajadhipok while she was Queen Aunt.

Queen Sri Savarindira was also the grandmother of King Bhumibol Adulyadej (Rama IX). Although her son, Crown Prince Maha Vajirunhis did not survive to become king she lived to see two of her grandsons become king.

The Queen also helped establish a hospital in Si Racha District, Chonburi Province, known today as Queen Savang Vadhana Memorial Hospital, operated by the Thai Red Cross Society.

Death

She died on 17 December 1955, at the age of 93. Her ashes were interred in the Royal Cemetery at Wat Ratchabophit, Bangkok. A residence of the queen can be seen at the Bang Pa-In Royal Palace. She resided in latter years at Sa Pathum Palace, The Royal Private Residence, located behind Siam Paragon Shopping center in downtown Bangkok, where a museum dedicated to her is being constructed at the Tamnak Yai Mansion (Grand mansion) inside Sa Pathum Palace. Her state funeral was the first to be covered briefly on television by the young Television of Thailand channel.

Queen Savang Vadhana Foundation was founded on 27 October 2005 under the aegis of Princess Maha Chakri Sirindhorn, her great-granddaughter.

Ancestors

Title, styles, honours and awards

Styles
 10 September 1862 - 1868 : Her Royal Highness Princess Savang Vadhana
 (Phra Chao Luk Thoe Phra Ong Chao Savang Vadhana)
 1868 - 1878 : Her Royal Highness Princess Savang Vadhana (The king's sister)
 (Phra Chao Nong Nang Thoe Phra Ong Chao Savang Vadhana)
 1878 - 12 August 1880 : Her Royal Highness Princess Savang Vadhana, The Royal Consort
 (Phra Nang Chao Savang Vadhana Phra Rajadevi)
 12 August 1880 - 17 February 1881 : Her Royal Highness Princess Savang Vadhana, The Princess Consort 
 (Somdet Phra Nang Chao Savang Vadhana Phra Rajadevi)
 17 February 1881 - 1920 : Her Majesty Queen Savang Vadhana
 (Somdet Phra Nang Chao Savang Vadhana Phra Borommarajadevi)
 1920 - 21 March 1925 : Her Majesty Queen Savang Vadhana, The Queen Aunt
 (Somdet Phra Matuccha Chao Savang Vadhana Phra Borommarajadevi)
 21 March 1925 - 25 March 1934 : Her Majesty Queen Sri Savarindira, The Queen Aunt
 (Somdet Phra Sri Savarindira Borommarajadevi Phra Phan Vassa Matuccha Chao)
 25 March 1934 - 17 December 1955 : Her Majesty Queen Sri Savarindira, The Queen Grandmother of Thailand
 (Somdet Phra Sri Savarindira Borommarajadevi Phra Phan Vassa Ayika Chao)

Honours
  The Most Illustrious Order of the Royal House of Chakri
  The Ancient and Auspicious of Order of the Nine Gems
  Dame Grand Cross (First Class) of The Most Illustrious Order of Chula Chom Klao
  Dame of the Ratana Varabhorn Order of Merit
  Dame Grand Cordon (Special Class) of The Most Noble Order of the Crown of Thailand
  King Rama IV Royal Cypher Medal (Second Class)
  King Rama V Royal Cypher Medal (First Class)
  King Rama VI Royal Cypher Medal (First Class)
  King Rama VII Royal Cypher Medal (First Class)
  King Rama VIII Royal Cypher Medal (First Class)
  King Rama IX Royal Cypher Medal (First Class)

Issue

See also
 King Ananda Mahidol
 King Bhumibol Adulyadej

References

External links
 Biography of Her Majesty Queen Savang Vadhana

|-

Thai queens consort
Consorts of Chulalongkorn
19th-century Thai women
19th-century Chakri dynasty
20th-century Thai women
20th-century Chakri dynasty
Knights Grand Cordon of the Order of Chula Chom Klao
Knights of the Ratana Varabhorn Order of Merit
1862 births
1955 deaths
Thai female Phra Ong Chao
Thai princesses consort
Children of Mongkut
Daughters of kings